The ponderous siltsnail or ponderous spring snail, scientific name Floridobia ponderosa, is a species of small freshwater snail, an aquatic gastropod mollusk in the family Hydrobiidae. This species is endemic to the United States.

References

Molluscs of the United States
Hydrobiidae
Floridobia
Gastropods described in 1968
Taxonomy articles created by Polbot